Khanlar (also Romanized as Khānlār) is a village in Bizineh Rud Rural District, Bizineh Rud District, Khodabandeh County, Zanjan Province, Iran. At the 2006 census, its population was 230, in 49 families.  
People of Khanlar all speak Azerbaijani Turkic.

References 

Populated places in Khodabandeh County